
Gmina Mierzęcice is a rural gmina (administrative district) in Będzin County, Silesian Voivodeship, in southern Poland.

Villages
Gmina Mierzęcice contains the villages and settlements of Boguchwałowice, Mierzęcice, Mierzęcice Osiedle, Najdziszów, Nowa Wieś, Przeczyce, Sadowie, Toporowice and Zawada.

Neighbouring gminas
Gmina Mierzęcice is bordered by the gminas of Bobrowniki, Ożarowice, Psary and Siewierz.

References

Mierzecice
Będzin County